Saint-Germain-des-Prés is a commune in the Dordogne department in Nouvelle-Aquitaine in southwestern France.

History
On the night of 13–14 June 2007, a flash flood caused by a storm turned the river Ravillou and its tributary Merdanson into devastating torrents, that damaged the town and the bridge across the Ravillou.

Population

See also
Communes of the Dordogne department

References

Communes of Dordogne
Arrondissement of Périgueux